Future Records is an independent record label based in Reykjavík, Iceland. It was started in 2006 by Hreinn Elíasson, Sigurmon Hartmann Sigurðsson and Ólafur Halldór Ólafsson – all artists themselves.

History

Artists

 Weapons
 Cosmic Call
 The Defaults

See also
 Virtual Studios
 Dirty Studios
 List of record labels

References

Alternative rock record labels
Indie rock record labels